= Tree Lake =

Lake of the United States of America

- Location within Wisconsin Location within the United States
- Location: Portage County, Wisconsin
- Coordinates: 44°40′22″N 89°16′26″W
- Type: lake
- Surface elevation: 1,145 feet (349 m)

Tree Lake is a lake in the U.S. state of Wisconsin.

The name Tree Lake most likely is a corruption of Three Lakes, the latter name since there are smaller lakes on either side of it.
